The 1933 Furman Purple Hurricane football team represented Furman University as a member of the Southern Intercollegiate Athletic Association (SIAA) during the 1933 college football season. Led by second-year head coach Dizzy McLeod, the Purple Hurricane compiled an overall record of 6–1–2, with a mark of 4–0–1 in conference play, and finished fourth in the SIAA.

Schedule

References

Furman
Furman Paladins football seasons
Furman Purple Hurricane football